Star Wars religion may refer to:

Jediism
Philosophy and religion in Star Wars

Star Wars